Antonio Thomaz Santos de Barros (born 2 May 1986), commonly known as Thomaz, is a Bolivian nationalized Brazilian professional footballer who plays as an attacking midfielder for Independiente Petrolero.

Career
Thomaz played for Juventus and Grêmio Barueri in his native Brazil before signing for Swiss club Chiasso in 2007. After spending the 2007–08 season in Switzerland, during which he scored four goals, Thomaz returned to Brazil to play for Avaí.

He moved to the United States in 2010 when he signed for Ventura County Fusion in the USL Premier Development League. Thomaz made his debut for Ventura on July 16, 2010 in a match against the Lancaster Rattlers.

Return to Caxias After the term of the loan, Thomaz returned to the Caxias for the dispute of the Gauchão.

Marcílio Dias Without being taken advantage of at the beginning of the 2012 season, he left the Caxias and was hired by Marcílio Dias the Catarinense Championship sequence.

Treze and Gurupi In 2013, he defended Treze and Gurupi.

Inter de Lages  Thomaz was hired by Inter de Lages for the Dispute of the Access Division of the Catarinense Championship. The athlete helped the club to conquer the title of the competition.

After the conquest, Thomaz went to defend Brasiliense.

Jorge Wilstermann in 2014 took the team "aviator" where he was wearing the shirt number 10 and becoming champion of the tournament with the team in the 2016 tournament of the Bolivian League.

On March 29, 2017, on the request of Rogério Ceni, São Paulo paid $130,000 to Jorge Wilstermann to hire Thomaz, who signed a contract with São Paulo for three seasons, receiving a salary of 50 thousand reais a month. On April 8, 2017, on the quarterfinals of Campeonato Paulista, he scored his first goal for his new club, in the win against Linense by 5x0.

Red Bull Brasil On January 11, 2018, he was hired (on loan) by Red Bull Brasil to play the Campeonato Paulista.

References

External links
 
 Brazilian FA Database
 ZeroZero Profile

1986 births
Living people
Brazilian footballers
Brazilian expatriate footballers
Association football midfielders
Footballers from São Paulo
São Paulo FC players
Sport Club Corinthians Paulista players
Clube Atlético Juventus players
Sport Club Internacional players
Grêmio Barueri Futebol players
FC Chiasso players
Avaí FC players
Rio Claro Futebol Clube players
Ventura County Fusion players
Sociedade Esportiva e Recreativa Caxias do Sul players
Hercílio Luz Futebol Clube players
Clube Náutico Marcílio Dias players
Esporte Clube Internacional de Lages players
Grêmio Osasco Audax Esporte Clube players
Treze Futebol Clube players
Gurupi Esporte Clube players
Brasiliense Futebol Clube players
Red Bull Brasil players
Paysandu Sport Club players
C.D. Jorge Wilstermann players
Club Bolívar players
Associação Atlética Internacional (Limeira) players
Operário Ferroviário Esporte Clube players
Club Independiente Petrolero players
USL League Two players
Campeonato Brasileiro Série A players
Campeonato Brasileiro Série B players
Campeonato Brasileiro Série D players
Bolivian Primera División players
Brazilian expatriate sportspeople in Switzerland
Brazilian expatriate sportspeople in the United States
Brazilian expatriate sportspeople in Bolivia
Expatriate footballers in Switzerland
Expatriate soccer players in the United States
Expatriate footballers in Bolivia